Losing Alice is an Israeli psychological thriller television series created, written, and directed by Sigal Avin for the Israeli channel Hot 3. The series follows a 48-year-old film director, Alice, whose career has slowed down while raising her three daughters, until she meets a young screenwriter, Sophie, who she quickly becomes obsessed with.

The series premiered in Israel on June 18, 2020 on Hot 3. It premiered internationally on January 22, 2021 on Apple TV+.

Plot
The series follows Alice Ginor (Ayelet Zurer), a 48-year-old esteemed filmmaker who feels stuck professionally, old externally, no longer relevant and tired in the face of the endless energy of her three daughters, whom she raises together with David (Gal Toren), a successful and coveted actor. One day, in a chance meeting on the train, Alice meets Sophie (Lihi Kornowski), a promising young femme fatale screenwriter in her 20s, who introduces herself as a fan of Alice and dreams that Alice will direct the script she wrote. Sophie's talent, youth and erupting sexuality arouse Alice, who develops an obsession with her and puts her into her professional, family and sexual life. In what appears to be a conscious choice, Alice is drawn into Sophie's dark and destructive world, and as the plot progresses and twists it is no longer clear who has penetrated whose life, who takes and who gives, and who will lead whom to the fatal end.

Cast
 Ayelet Zurer as Alice
 Lihi Kornowski as Sophie
 Gal Toren as David
 Shai Avivi as Ami
 Chelli Goldenberg as Tami
 Nova Doval as Keren
 Yossi Marshek as Tamir

Episodes

Production
Originally airing on Hot 3 in Israel, Apple announced in June 2020, that it had partnered with Dori Media productions and Hot to co-produce and exclusively stream Losing Alice internationally on Apple TV+.

Critical reception
On review aggregator Rotten Tomatoes, Losing Alice holds an approval rating of 75% based on 16 reviews, with an average rating of 7.5/10. The website's critical consensus reads, "Twisty and thrilling, if a tad long, Losing Alice is an engaging psychological drama with style to spare." On Metacritic, which uses a weighted average, it has a score of 75 out of 100 based on 5 reviews, indicating “generally favorable reviews”.

References

External links
 Losing Alice – official site
 
 
 

2020 Israeli television series debuts
2020 Israeli television series endings
2020s Israeli television series
Israeli thriller television series
Psychological thriller television series
Apple TV+ original programming
Hebrew-language television series